Liverpool School Board was one of the School boards in England and Wales 
established under the Elementary Education Act 1870.

Liverpool School Board was composed of 15 directly elected members. 
Each voter had fifteen votes to cast and was "entitled to divide his fifteen votes amongst 
as many of the candidates as he pleases, or to give whole fifteen to one candidate."

The majority of members elected stood on religious tickets.

School boards were abolished by the Education Act 1902, which transferred
control of state funded schools in Liverpool to the Education Committee of 
Liverpool City Council.

Liverpool School Board elections
1900 Liverpool School Board election
1897 Liverpool School Board election
1894 Liverpool School Board election
1891 Liverpool School Board election
1888 Liverpool School Board election
1885 Liverpool School Board election
1882 Liverpool School Board election
1879 Liverpool School Board election
1876 Liverpool School Board election
1873 Liverpool School Board election
1870 Liverpool School Board election

References